Imolese Calcio 1919 is an Italian football club based in Imola, Emilia-Romagna. Currently it plays in Italy's Serie C.

History

Foundation
The club was founded in 1919.

It has suffered three failures: one in 1989/90 that cost the promotion to Serie C2 after beating Gualdo in the playoffs.

in 2005 A.C. Imolese S.r.l. was expelled from 2005–06 Serie C2, which a new company was re-found and was admitted to Eccellenza Emilia-Romagna. In the 2005–06 season Imolese was relegated to Promozione after reaching sixteenth in Emilia–Romagna Group B.

The following season Imolese won by a wide margin the Promozione of their group, and then returned to Eccellenza.

In the 2012–2013 season it won promotion to Serie D, winning Giulianova in the play-off semi-final and San Colombano in the final.

Colors and badge
The team's colors are red and blue.

Current squad

Out on loan

References

External links
Official website 

Imolese Calcio 1919
Football clubs in Italy
Association football clubs established in 1919
Football clubs in Emilia-Romagna
1919 establishments in Italy
Serie C clubs